The Bell Curve Debate is a 1995 book edited by the historian Russell Jacoby and the writer Naomi Glauberman.

Summary 
A response to The Bell Curve (1994), by the psychologist Richard Herrnstein and the political scientist Charles Murray, The Bell Curve Debate includes 81 articles by 81 authors. Contemporary authors whose writings are collected in the book include K. Anthony Appiah, Gregg Easterbrook, Howard Gardner, Eugene D. Genovese, Nathan Glazer, Stephen Jay Gould, Bob Herbert, Richard Herrnstein, Christopher Hitchens, Irving Louis Horowitz, Arthur Jensen, Leon J. Kamin, Charles Lane, Glenn C. Loury, Richard E. Nisbett, Nell Irvin Painter, Hugh Pearson, Adolph Reed Jr., Carl Rowan, Alan Ryan, Brent Staples, Ellen Willis, and Christopher Winship. Jacoby and Glauberman republish historical materials by authors including Carl Brigham, Theodosius Dobzhansky, Francis Galton, Walter Lippmann, Karl Pearson, and Lewis Terman. The publisher, Times Books, describes the book as a compilation of "the best of recent reviews and essays, and salient documents drawn from the curious history of this heated debate" capturing "the fervor, anger, and scope of an almost unprecedented national argument over the very idea of democracy and the possibility of a tolerant, multiracial America. It is an essential companion and answer to The Bell Curve and provides scholarship and polemic from every point of view."

Since publication, The Bell Curve Debate has been cited by books describing the issues surrounding IQ testing and scores of various social groups in the United States.

See also
 History of the race and intelligence controversy

References

1995 non-fiction books
American essay collections
Books about The Bell Curve
Books about education
Books by Russell Jacoby
English-language books
Race and intelligence controversy
Random House books
Times Books books